Pavermenys Manor is a former residential manor in Pavermenys, Kėdainiai District Municipality, Lithuania. Pavermenys Manor was established in 1585. Main manor building, barn, icehouse, and park with old linden alley have survived to present day.

References

Manor houses in Lithuania
Classicism architecture in Lithuania